The 2010–11 Toronto Maple Leafs season was the 94th season for the National Hockey League franchise that was established on November 22, 1917, and its 84th season since adopting the Maple Leafs name in February 1927.

The Maple Leafs posted a regular season record of 37 wins, 34 losses and 11 overtime/shootout losses for 85 points, failing to qualify for the Stanley Cup playoffs for the sixth consecutive season.

Draft 
The Maple Leafs did not have a first round selection in the 2010 NHL Entry Draft, having traded it to the Boston Bruins in the Phil Kessel deal. The selection ended up being the second overall pick, which the Bruins used to select Tyler Seguin. The Leafs made their first selection in the second round, having traded Jimmy Hayes to the Chicago Blackhawks for the 43rd overall pick, used on Bradley Ross of the Portland Winterhawks. After Ross, the Leafs made six other selections in the later rounds of the draft, including Greg McKegg, Sondre Olden, Petter Granberg, Daniel Brodin, Sam Carrick and Josh Nicholls.

Off-season 
On June 14, 2010, general manager Brian Burke held a press conference to unveil the team's new sweaters for the 2010–11 season and also named Dion Phaneuf the 18th captain of the Toronto Maple Leafs.

Regular season 
The Maple Leafs started the season significantly better than in 2009–10. On October 7, 2010, the Maple Leafs won their first home opener since October 7, 2000. On October 15, 2010, the Maple Leafs won their fourth consecutive game, beating the New York Rangers 4–3 on the road. The Leafs had started a regular season with four consecutive wins since the 1993–94 season, when they won their first 10 games.

Over the 82-game regular season, the Leafs were shut-out a league-high 11 times, tied with the Washington Capitals.

Playoffs 
The Maple Leafs attempted to make the playoffs for the first time since the 2003–04 season. They were officially eliminated from playoff contention on April 5, 2011, when the Buffalo Sabres won against the Tampa Bay Lightning 4–2, shortly before Toronto lost to the Washington Capitals in a shoot-out. The Leafs hold the longest active Stanley Cup Finals drought streak not having competed in the finals since the 1966–67 NHL season. They also are tied with the Los Angeles Kings and the St. Louis Blues for the longest drought without a Stanley Cup until the Kings won the Stanley Cup in 2012, followed by the Blues in 2019. In the 2009–10 season, the Chicago Blackhawks ended the longest drought without winning a Stanley Cup at that time, not having won the Stanley Cup since the 1960–61 season.

Standings

Schedule and results

Pre-season 

|- style="text-align:center; background:#fbb;"
| 1 || September 21 || Ottawa Senators || 0–5 || Air Canada Centre || Gustavsson || 0–1–0 ||
|- style="text-align:center; background:#cfc;"
| 2 || September 22 || Ottawa Senators || 4–1 || Air Canada Centre || Reimer || 1–1–0 ||
|- style="text-align:center; background:#cfc;"
| 3 || September 23 || @ Philadelphia Flyers || 3–2 (SO) || John Labatt Centre || Gustavsson || 2–1–0 ||
|- style="text-align:center; background:#ffc;"
| 4 || September 24 || Philadelphia Flyers || 3–4 (SO) || Air Canada Centre || Giguere || 2–1–1 ||
|- style="text-align:center; background:#fbb;"
| 5 || September 25 || @ Buffalo Sabres || 1–3 || HSBC Arena || Gustavsson || 2–2–1 ||
|- style="text-align:center; background:#cfc;"
| 6 || September 27 || Buffalo Sabres || 5–4 || Air Canada Centre || Gustavsson || 3–2–1 ||
|- style="text-align:center; background:#cfc;"
| 7 || September 29 || @ Ottawa Senators || 4–3 || Scotiabank Place || Giguere || 4–2–1 ||
|- style="text-align:center; background:#fbb;"
| 8 || October 1 || @ Detroit Red Wings || 3–7 || Joe Louis Arena || Rynnas || 4–3–1 ||
|- style="text-align:center; background:#cfc;"
| 9 || October 2 || Detroit Red Wings || 4–2 || Air Canada Centre || Giguere || 5–3–1 ||
|-

Regular season 

|- style="text-align:center; background:#cfc;"
| 1 || 7 || Montreal Canadiens || 3–2 || Air Canada Centre (19,646) || 1–0–0 || 2 || Giguere
|- style="text-align:center; background:#cfc;"
| 2 || 9 || Ottawa Senators || 5–1 || Air Canada Centre (19,157) || 2–0–0 || 4 || Giguere
|- style="text-align:center; background:#cfc;"
| 3 || 13 || @ Pittsburgh Penguins || 4–3 || Consol Energy Center (18,112) || 3–0–0 || 6 || Gustavsson
|- style="text-align:center; background:#cfc;"
| 4 || 15 || @ New York Rangers || 4–3 (OT) || Madison Square Garden (18,200) || 4–0–0 || 8 || Giguere
|- style="text-align:center; background:#ffc;"
| 5 || 18 || New York Islanders || 1–2 (OT) || Air Canada Centre (19,086) || 4–0–1 || 9 || Giguere
|- style="text-align:center; background:#fbb;"
| 6 || 21 || New York Rangers || 1–2 || Air Canada Centre (19,310) || 4–1–1 || 9 || Gustavsson
|- style="text-align:center; background:#fbb;"
| 7 || 23 || @ Philadelphia Flyers || 2–5 || Wells Fargo Center (19,382) || 4–2–1 || 9 || Giguere
|- style="text-align:center; background:#cfc;"
| 8 || 26 || Florida Panthers || 3–1 || Air Canada Centre (19,239) || 5–2–1 || 11 || Giguere
|- style="text-align:center; background:#fbb;"
| 9 || 28 || @ Boston Bruins || 0–2 || TD Garden (17,565) || 5–3–1 || 11 || Gustavsson
|- style="text-align:center; background:#fbb;"
| 10 || 30 || New York Rangers || 0–2 || Air Canada Centre (19,063) || 5–4–1 || 11 || Giguere
|-

|- style="text-align:center; background:#fbb;"
| 11 || 2 || Ottawa Senators || 2–3 || Air Canada Centre (19,409) || 5–5–1 || 11 || Giguere
|- style="text-align:center; background:#ffc;"
| 12 || 3 || @ Washington Capitals || 4–5 (SO) || Verizon Center (18,398) || 5–5–2 || 12 || Gustavsson
|- style="text-align:center; background:#ffc;"
| 13 || 6 || Buffalo Sabres || 2–3 (SO) || Air Canada Centre (19,329) || 5–5–3 || 13 || Giguere
|- style="text-align:center; background:#fbb;"
| 14 || 9 || @ Tampa Bay Lightning || 0–4 || St. Pete Times Forum (16,791) || 5–6–3 || 13 || Giguere
|- style="text-align:center; background:#fbb;"
| 15 || 10 || @ Florida Panthers || 1–4 || BankAtlantic Center (15,243) || 5–7–3 || 13 || Gustavsson
|- style="text-align:center; background:#fbb;"
| 16 || 13 || Vancouver Canucks || 3–5 || Air Canada Centre (19,534) || 5–8–3 || 13 || Giguere
|- style="text-align:center; background:#cfc;"
| 17 || 16 || Nashville Predators || 5–4 || Air Canada Centre (19,069) || 6–8–3 || 15 || Giguere
|- style="text-align:center; background:#cfc;"
| 18 || 18 || New Jersey Devils || 3–1 || Air Canada Centre (19,271) || 7–8–3 || 17 || Gustavsson
|- style="text-align:center; background:#fbb;"
| 19 || 20 || @ Montreal Canadiens || 0–2 || Bell Centre (21,273) || 7–9–3 || 17 || Gustavsson
|- style="text-align:center; background:#cfc;"
| 20 || 22 || Dallas Stars || 4–1 || Air Canada Centre (19,266) || 8–9–3 || 19 || Gustavsson
|- style="text-align:center; background:#fbb;"
| 21 || 26 || @ Buffalo Sabres || 1–3 || HSBC Arena (18,004) || 8–10–3 || 19 || Gustavsson
|- style="text-align:center; background:#fbb;"
| 22 || 27 || @ Ottawa Senators || 0–3 || Scotiabank Place (20,275) || 8–11–3 || 19 || Gustavsson
|- style="text-align:center; background:#ffc;"
| 23 || 30 || Tampa Bay Lightning || 3–4 (OT) || Air Canada Centre (19,063) || 8–11–4 || 20 || Gustavsson
|-

|- style="text-align:center; background:#fbb;"
| 24 || 2 || Edmonton Oilers || 0–5 || Air Canada Centre (19,465) || 8–12–4 || 20 ||Gustavsson
|- style="text-align:center; background:#cfc;"
| 25 || 4 || Boston Bruins || 3–2 (SO) || Air Canada Centre (19,483) || 9–12–4 || 22 || Giguere
|- style="text-align:center; background:#cfc;"
| 26 || 6 || @ Washington Capitals || 5–4 (SO) || Verizon Center (18,398) || 10–12–4 || 24 || Gustavsson
|- style="text-align:center; background:#fbb;"
| 27 || 8 || @ Pittsburgh Penguins || 2–5 || Consol Energy Center (18,158) || 10–13–4 || 24 || Gustavsson
|- style="text-align:center; background:#fbb;"
| 28 || 9 || Philadelphia Flyers || 1–4 || Air Canada Centre (19,365) || 10–14–4 || 24 || Giguere
|- style="text-align:center; background:#cfc;"
| 29 || 11 || Montreal Canadiens || 3–1 || Air Canada Centre (19,656) || 11–14–4 || 26 || Giguere
|- style="text-align:center; background:#cfc;"
| 30 || 14 || @ Edmonton Oilers || 4–1 || Rexall Place (16,839) || 12–14–4 || 28 || Giguere
|- style="text-align:center; background:#fbb;"
| 31 || 16 || @ Calgary Flames || 2–5 || Pengrowth Saddledome (19,289) || 12–15–4 || 28 || Giguere
|- style="text-align:center; background:#fbb;"
| 32 || 18 || @ Vancouver Canucks || 1–4 || Rogers Arena (18,860) || 12–16–4 || 28 || Gustavsson
|- style="text-align:center; background:#fbb;"
| 33 || 20 || Atlanta Thrashers || 3–6 || Air Canada Centre (19,301) || 12–17–4 || 28 || Gustavsson
|- style="text-align:center; background:#cfc;"
| 34 || 26 || @ New Jersey Devils || 4–1 || Prudential Center (5,329) || 13–17–4 || 30 || Gustavsson
|- style="text-align:center; background:#fbb;"
| 35 || 28 || Carolina Hurricanes || 3–4 || Air Canada Centre (19,309) || 13–18–4 || 30 || Gustavsson
|- style="text-align:center; background:#fbb;"
| 36 || 30 || Columbus Blue Jackets || 2–3 || Air Canada Centre (19,148) || 13–19–4 || 30 || Gustavsson
|-

|- style="text-align:center; background:#cfc;"
| 37 || 1 || @ Ottawa Senators || 5–1 || Scotiabank Place (20,027) || 14–19–4 || 32 || Reimer
|- style="text-align:center; background:#fbb;"
| 38 || 3 || Boston Bruins || 1–2 || Air Canada Centre (19,052) || 14–20–4 || 32 || Reimer
|- style="text-align:center; background:#cfc;"
| 39 || 6 || St. Louis Blues || 6–5 (SO) || Air Canada Centre (19,283) || 15–20–4 || 34 || Gustavsson
|- style="text-align:center; background:#cfc;"
| 40 || 7 || @ Atlanta Thrashers || 9–3 || Philips Arena (14,592) || 16–20–4 || 36 || Reimer
|- style="text-align:center; background:#cfc;"
| 41 || 10 || @ Los Angeles Kings || 3–2 || Staples Center (17,834) || 17–20–4 || 38 || Reimer
|- style="text-align:center; background:#cfc;"
| 42 || 11 || @ San Jose Sharks || 4–2 || HP Pavilion (17,562) || 18–20–4 || 40 || Reimer
|- style="text-align:center; background:#fbb;"
| 43 || 13 || @ Phoenix Coyotes || 1–5 || Jobing.com Arena (11,205) || 18–21–4 || 40 || Reimer
|- style="text-align:center; background:#ffc;"
| 44 || 15 || Calgary Flames || 1–2 (SO) || Air Canada Centre (19,462) || 18–21–5 || 41 || Giguere
|- style="text-align:center; background:#fbb;"
| 45 || 19 || @ New York Rangers || 0–7 || Madison Square Garden (18,200) || 18–22–5 || 41 || Gustavsson
|- style="text-align:center; background:#cfc;"
| 46 || 20 || Anaheim Ducks || 5–2 || Air Canada Centre (19,399) || 19–22–5 || 43 || Giguere
|- style="text-align:center; background:#fbb;"
| 47 || 22 || Washington Capitals || 1–4 || Air Canada Centre (19,554) || 19–23–5 || 43 || Giguere
|- style="text-align:center; background:#fbb;"
| 48 || 24 || @ Carolina Hurricanes || 4–6 || RBC Center (16,201) || 19–24–5 || 43 || Giguere
|- style="text-align:center; background:#fbb;"
| 49 || 25 || @ Tampa Bay Lightning || 0–2 || St. Pete Times Forum (14,335) || 19–25–5 || 43 || Reimer
|-

|- style="text-align:center; background:#cfc;"
| 50 || 1 || Florida Panthers || 4–3 (SO) || Air Canada Centre (19,018) || 20–25–5 || 45 || Giguere
|- style="text-align:center; background:#cfc;"
| 51 || 3 || Carolina Hurricanes || 3–0 || Air Canada Centre (19,220) || 21–25–5 || 47 || Reimer
|- style="text-align:center; background:#fbb;"
| 52 || 5 || @ Buffalo Sabres || 2–6 || HSBC Arena (18,264) || 21–26–5 || 47 || Reimer
|- style="text-align:center; background:#cfc;"
| 53 || 7 || Atlanta Thrashers || 5–4 || Air Canada Centre (19,104) || 22–26–5 || 49 || Giguere
|- style="text-align:center; background:#cfc;"
| 54 || 8 || @ New York Islanders || 5–3 || Nassau Veterans Memorial Coliseum (7,249) || 23–26–5 || 51 || Reimer
|- style="text-align:center; background:#ffc;"
| 55 || 10 || New Jersey Devils || 1–2 (OT) || Air Canada Centre (19,260) || 23–26–6 || 52 || Reimer
|- style="text-align:center; background:#fbb;"
| 56 || 12 || @ Montreal Canadiens || 0–3 || Bell Centre (21,273) || 23–27–6 || 52 || Giguere
|- style="text-align:center; background:#cfc;"
| 57 || 15 || @ Boston Bruins || 4–3 || TD Garden (17,565) || 24–27–6 || 54 || Reimer
|- style="text-align:center; background:#cfc;"
| 58 || 16 || @ Buffalo Sabres || 2–1 || HSBC Arena (18,414) || 25–27–6 || 56 || Reimer
|- style="text-align:center; background:#ffc;"
| 59 || 19 || Ottawa Senators || 0–1 (SO) || Air Canada Centre (19,460) || 25–27–7 || 57 || Reimer
|- style="text-align:center; background:#cfc;"
| 60 || 22 || New York Islanders || 2–1 || Air Canada Centre (19,459) || 26–27–7 || 59 || Reimer
|- style="text-align:center; background:#cfc;"
| 61 || 24 || @ Montreal Canadiens || 5–4 || Bell Centre (21,273) || 27–27–7 || 61 || Reimer
|- style="text-align:center; background:#ffc;"
| 62 || 26 || Pittsburgh Penguins || 5–6 (SO) || Air Canada Centre (19,551) || 27–27–8 || 62 ||Reimer
|- style="text-align:center; background:#ffc;"
| 63 || 27 || @ Atlanta Thrashers || 2–3 (OT) || Philips Arena (13,147) || 27–27–9 || 63 || Giguere
|-

|- style="text-align:center; background:#cfc;"
| 64 || 2 || Pittsburgh Penguins || 3–2 (OT) || Air Canada Centre (19,473) || 28–27–9 || 65 || Reimer
|- style="text-align:center; background:#cfc;"
| 65 || 3 || @ Philadelphia Flyers || 3–2 || Wells Fargo Center (19,811) || 29–27–9 || 67 || Reimer
|- style="text-align:center; background:#fbb;"
| 66 || 5 || Chicago Blackhawks || 3–5 || Air Canada Centre (19,646) || 29–28–9 || 67 || Reimer
|- style="text-align:center; background:#ffc;"
| 67 || 8 || @ New York Islanders || 3–4 (OT)|| Nassau Veterans Memorial Coliseum (9,217) || 29–28–10 || 68 || Reimer
|- style="text-align:center; background:#fbb"
| 68 || 10 || Philadelphia Flyers || 2–3 || Air Canada Centre (19,475) || 29–29–10 || 68 || Reimer
|- style="text-align:center; background:#cfc;"
| 69 || 12 || Buffalo Sabres || 4–3 || Air Canada Centre (19,347) || 30–29–10 || 70 || Reimer
|- style="text-align:center; background:#fbb;"
| 70 || 14 || Tampa Bay Lightning || 2–6 || Air Canada Centre (19,410) || 30–30–10 || 70 || Reimer
|- style="text-align:center; background:#cfc;"
| 71 || 16 || @ Carolina Hurricanes || 3–1 || RBC Center (15,220) || 31–30–10 || 72 || Reimer
|- style="text-align:center; background:#fbb;"
| 72 || 17 || @ Florida Panthers || 0–4 || BankAtlantic Center (16,970) || 31–31–10 || 72 || Giguere
|- style="text-align:center; background:#cfc;"
| 73 || 19 || Boston Bruins || 5–2 || Air Canada Centre (19,512) || 32–31–10 || 74 || Reimer
|- style="text-align:center; background:#cfc;"
| 74 || 22 || @ Minnesota Wild || 3–0 || Xcel Energy Center (18,761) || 33–31–10 || 76 || Reimer
|- style="text-align:center; background:#cfc;"
| 75 || 24 || @ Colorado Avalanche || 4–3 || Pepsi Center (14,364) || 34–31–10 || 78 || Reimer
|- style="text-align:center; background:#fbb;"
| 76 || 26 || @ Detroit Red Wings || 2–4 || Joe Louis Arena (20,066) || 34–32–10 || 78 || Reimer
|- style="text-align:center; background:#cfc"
| 77 || 29 || Buffalo Sabres || 4–3 || Air Canada Centre (19,483) || 35–32–10 || 80 || Reimer
|- style="text-align:center; background:#cfc"
| 78 || 31 || @ Boston Bruins || 4–3 (SO) || TD Garden (17,565) || 36–32–10 || 82 || Reimer
|-

|- style="text-align:center; background:#cfc"
| 79 || 2 || @ Ottawa Senators || 4–2 || Scotiabank Place (19,243) || 37–32–10 || 84 ||Reimer
|- style="text-align:center; background:#ffc;"
| 80 || 5 || Washington Capitals || 2–3 (SO)|| Air Canada Centre (19,509) || 37–32–11 || 85 ||Reimer
|- style="text-align:center; background:#fbb;"
| 81 || 6 || @ New Jersey Devils || 2–4 || Prudential Center (14,207) || 37–33–11 || 85 ||Reimer
|- style="text-align:center; background:#fbb;"
| 82 || 9 || Montreal Canadiens || 1–4 || Air Canada Centre (19,676) || 37–34–11 || 85 ||Reimer
|- style="text-align:center;" bgcolor=""

Overtime statistics

Player statistics
Final stats

Skaters

Goaltenders

†Denotes player spent time with another team before joining Maple Leafs. Stats reflect time with Maple Leafs only.
‡Traded mid-season.
Bold/italics denotes franchise record.

Awards and records

Awards

Records

Milestones

Transactions 
The Maple Leafs have been involved in the following transactions during the 2010–11 season.

Trades

Free agents acquired

Free agents lost

Claimed via waivers

Lost via waivers

Lost via retirement

Player signings

Draft picks 
Toronto's picks at the 2010 NHL Entry Draft in Los Angeles.

Farm teams 
 The Maple Leafs continue their affiliation with the Toronto Marlies of the American Hockey League and the Reading Royals of the ECHL.

See also 
 2010–11 NHL season

References

External links 
 2010–11 Toronto Maple Leafs season at Official Site
 2010–11 Toronto Maple Leafs season at ESPN
 2010–11 Toronto Maple Leafs season at Hockey Reference

Toronto Maple Leafs seasons
Toronto Maple Leafs season, 2010-11
Toronto